IRIAF can refer to:
Institut des Risques Industriels, Assurantiels et Financiers, part of the University of Poitiers in France
Islamic Republic of Iran Air Force